The Stags Leap District AVA is an American Viticultural Area located within the Napa Valley AVA  north of the city of Napa, California.  The Stags Leap District was the first appellation to be designated an AVA based on the unique terroir characteristics of its soil. The soil of this region include loam and clay sediments from the Napa River and volcanic soil deposits left over from erosion of the Vaca Mountains. Like many Napa Valley AVAs, Stags Leap District is particularly known for its Cabernet Sauvignon. In 1976 at the Judgment of Paris wine tasting, the 1973 Stag's Leap Wine Cellars Cabernet from the area that would become this AVA won first place in the red wine category, beating out classified Bordeaux estates. Today, the Stags Leap District is home to twenty different wineries.

History

Grapes were planted in the area that would become the Stags Leap District as early as the 1870s, with the first winery in the area being founded in 1878. Nathan Fay planted the first Cabernet Sauvignon in the area in 1961, on land that would later be purchased by Warren Winiarski for Stag's Leap Wine Cellars.

Winery Association
One of the leading forces in the region is Stags Leap District Winery Association which aims to promote the wines of the AVA and host an annual day-long event called Vineyard to Vintner which allows consumers the opportunity to interact with wineries and taste the regions wine. The following wineries are members:

Baldacci Family Vineyards
Chimney Rock Winery
Cliff Lede Vineyards
Clos Du Val
Malk Family Vineyards
Ilsley Vineyards
Pine Ridge Vineyards
Regusci Winery
Shafer Vineyards
Silverado Vineyards
Stags' Leap Winery
Stag's Leap Wine Cellars
Steltzner Vineyards
Taylor Family Vineyards

References

American Viticultural Areas of the San Francisco Bay Area
Geography of Napa County, California
American Viticultural Areas
1989 establishments in California